North DeLand is a census-designated place (CDP) in Volusia County, Florida, United States. The population was 1,510 at the 2020 census.

Geography
North DeLand is located at  (29.046854, -81.297914).

Demographics

As of the census of 2000, there were 1,327 people, 532 households, and 347 families residing in the CDP.  The population density was 868.4/km (2,253.7/mi2).  There were 563 housing units at an average density of 368.4/km (956.2/mi2).  The racial makeup of the CDP was 90.96% White, 2.56% African American, 0.68% Native American, 1.73% Asian, 2.11% from other races, and 1.96% from two or more races. Hispanic or Latino of any race were 7.69% of the population.

There were 532 households, out of which 29.3% had children under the age of 18 living with them, 43.0% were married couples living together, 16.0% had a female householder with no husband present, and 34.6% were non-families. 26.3% of all households were made up of individuals, and 11.7% had someone living alone who was 65 years of age or older.  The average household size was 2.49 and the average family size was 2.99.

In the CDP, the population was spread out, with 25.8% under the age of 18, 7.8% from 18 to 24, 28.3% from 25 to 44, 22.1% from 45 to 64, and 16.1% who were 65 years of age or older.  The median age was 37 years. For every 100 females, there were 95.7 males.  For every 100 females age 18 and over, there were 86.0 males.

The median income for a household in the CDP was $30,288, and the median income for a family was $44,583. Males had a median income of $29,408 versus $28,542 for females. The per capita income for the CDP was $17,489.  About 7.4% of families and 11.8% of the population were below the poverty line, including 16.9% of those under age 18 and none of those age 65 or over.

References

Census-designated places in Volusia County, Florida
Census-designated places in Florida